The Pearls of the Crown is a 1937 French comedy film of historically based fiction by Sacha Guitry who plays four roles in it (many of the other performers play multiple roles, as well). Guitry's Jean Martin investigates the history of seven pearls, four of which end up on the crown of England, while the other three initially go missing.

It was made at the Billancourt Studios in Paris with location shooting at a variety of sites including the Abbaye de Royaumont, the Château de Louveciennes and aboard the S.S. Normandie. The film's sets were designed by the art director Jean Perrier.

Plot
Tracing the history of seven valuable pearls of the English Crown from the time of Henry VIII of England to the present day (1937). Writer Jean Martin (Sacha Guitry) attempts to track down three of the missing pearls by tracing their previous owners, with events seen in flashback, involving Napoleon, King Henry VIII and Elizabeth I of England amongst others.

Cast

Sacha Guitry as Jean Martin/François I/Viscount Barras/Old Napoleon III
Jacqueline Delubac as Françoise Martin/Mary, Queen of Scots/Josephine
Lyn Harding as John Russell/Henry VIII
Renée Saint-Cyr as Madeleine de la Tour d'Auvergne
Enrico Glori as Pope's Chamberlain
Ermete Zacconi as Pope Clement VII
Barbara Shaw as Anne Boleyn
Marguerite Moreno as Catherine de'Medici/Empress Eugenie
Arletty as Queen of Abyssinia
Marcel Dalio as Abyssinian Minister/Jewel Seller 
Claude Dauphin as Italian in Abyssinia
Robert Seller as Englishman in Abyssinia
Ponzio as Singing worker
Andrews Engelmann as The Lead Robber 
Yvette Pienne as Queen Mary I of England (Mary Tudor)/Queen Elizabeth I/Queen Victoria
Raimu as Industrialist
Lisette Lanvin as Femme du monde/Reine Victoria
Pierre Juvenet as The Expert
Henri Crémieux as Auctioneer
Aimé Simon-Girard as Henri IV
Germaine Aussey as Gabrielle d'Estrées
Simone Renant as Madame Du Barry
Damia as Woman of the People
Di Mazzei as Sans-coulotte
Jean-Louis Barrault as Lorenzo de Medicia/Young Bonaparte 
Robert Pizani as Talleyrand 
Émile Drain as Napoleon I (1815)
Huguette Duflos as Queen Hortense
Raymonde Allain as Empress Eugenie (1865)
Violet Farebrother as An Old Lady
Rosine Deréan as Young girl/Catherine d'Aragon
Marie Leconte as A Woman in Misery
Pierre Magnier as An Old Lord
Cécile Sorel as A Courtesan (5th billed in star credit!)
Lillie Grandval as Opera Soprano
Jean Coquelin as An Old man
Gaston Dubosc as A Grand Duke
Pauline Carton as Femme du Chambre
Anaclara as La négresse
Colette Borelli as Mary Stuart (girl)
Julien Clément as Le gigolo
Marfa d'Hervilly as La vieille courtisane
Denis de Marney as Darnley
Aline Debray 
Dynalik as Le petit rat
Georges Fels as ?
Eugénie Fougère as La vieille coquette
Gary Garland as Une passagère sur le Normandie
Anthony Gildès as Le vieil hongrois
Georges Grey as Le jeune hongrois
Geneviève Guitry as ?
Lautner as Le Titien
Oléo as La petite poule
Jacqueline Pacaud as Jane Seymour
Annie Rozanne as ?
Léon Walther as Anne de Montmorency
Laurence Atkins as Madame Tallien/Madame d'Estampes 
Jacques Berlioz as ?
? as Hipollite 
Humberto Catalano as Spanelli (uncredited!) 
James Craven as Hans Holbein 
Derrick De Marney as Darnley 
Fred Duprez as An American
Romuald Joubé as Clouet 
Darling Légitimus as ?
Percy Marmont as Cardinal Wolsey 
Paulette Élambert as Catherine de Medici (girl)

Critical reception
Writing for Night and Day in 1937, Graham Greene gave the film a good review claiming that it "entertained me even more than it irritated me". Admitting some degree of distaste in director Guitry's general style and demeanor, Greene found admiration in Guitry's "ingenious[] attempts to give a wider circulation to a French picture by working the story out in three languages" and described his use of language in certain scenes as "cunningly and quite naturally arranged". Greene praised the story and the acting of  Guitry and Delubac.

TV Guide gave the film three out of four stars, writing, "Although Guitry chose to push the audience's patience a bit by filming the story in three languages, PEARLS OF THE CROWN is one of his finest works, and perhaps his least theatrical. (In French, Italian, and English; English subtitles)."

References

External links 

1937 films
1930s historical comedy-drama films
French historical comedy-drama films
1930s French-language films
Films set in Paris
Films set in London
Films set in England
1930s Italian-language films
Depictions of Napoleon on film
Films directed by Sacha Guitry
Films set in the 16th century
Films set in the 19th century
Treasure hunt films
Cultural depictions of Napoleon III
Cultural depictions of Mary I of England
Cultural depictions of Elizabeth I
Cultural depictions of Anne Boleyn
Cultural depictions of Mary, Queen of Scots
Cultural depictions of Marie de' Medici
Cultural depictions of Catherine de' Medici
Cultural depictions of Queen Victoria on film
Films shot at Billancourt Studios
Tobis Film films
1930s English-language films
1937 multilingual films
French multilingual films
1930s French films